The African scops owl (Otus senegalensis) is a small owl which is widespread in sub-Saharan Africa.

Taxonomy
William John Swainson first described the species in 1837 from a specimen collected in Senegal, and initially assigned it to the now defunct genus Scops. Today the species is assigned to the genus Otus.

There are three subspecies currently recognised:

Otus senegalensis senegalensis: Widespread in sub-Saharan Africa
Otus senegalensis nivosus: Found in south-eastern Kenya from the lower Tana River to the Lali Hills
Otus senegalensis feae: Endemic to Annobón island in the Gulf of Guinea (regarded by Birdlife International as a separate species, the Annobón scops owl)

The African scops owl was formerly regarded as the African subspecies of the European scops owl. It was grouped with the Arabian scops owl, Socotra scops owl, and the Annobón scops owl into Otus senegalensis; however, these species are now considered to be separate.

Description
It is typically greyish-brown, though sometimes pale rufous or warmer brown, and is cryptically marked with streaks and mottling. Its grey facial disk has a narrow black edge, and its eyes are yellow. It has ear-tufts, which are generally kept lowered unless the bird is disturbed.

Voice
The African scops owl gives a monotonous quivering distinctive "prrrp" at five second intervals.

Similar species
The migrant Eurasian scops owl is very similar to the African scops owl; while it is typically slightly larger, it may not be distinguishable in the field.

Range and habitat
The African scops owl is endemic to sub-Saharan Africa.

Behaviour
The African scops owl is strictly nocturnal. During the day, it perches close to the trunk of a tree. When roosting in daylight, this species closes its eyes and extends its ear-tufts to give the impression of a tree branch, making it easily overlooked. Pairs sometimes roost together. The African scops owl is not as territorial as the Eurasian scops owl and will nest in loose aggregations, with the nest sites relatively close to each other.

The male and female may duet, calling all night both before and after leaving the roost site. The African scops owl lays four to six eggs directly onto the floor of a tree hollow, with laying occurring throughout April and June. Incubation lasts about 27 days, during which the female incubates the eggs and is fed by the male. Once the eggs hatch the young are fed by the female with food brought by the male. The young fledge in 30 days.

The prey of the African scops owl is mainly insects such as grasshoppers, beetles, crickets, moths etc. but also spiders, scorpions and small vertebrates. They normally hunt by scanning or listening from a perch and swooping down to capture prey on the ground, but will hawk for flying insects.

References

External links

 African Scops Owl - Species text in The Atlas of Southern African Birds.
 African Scops-Owl (Otus senegalensis) videos and photos at Internet Bird Collection

African scops owl
Birds of Africa
Owls of Sub-Saharan Africa
Birds of Southern Africa
African scope owl